María José Portillo Ramírez (born 8 May 1999) is a Mexican tennis player.

She has career-high WTA rankings of 413 in singles and 413 in doubles. Portillo Ramírez has won two singles titles and eleven doubles titles at tournaments of the ITF Women's Circuit.

Playing for the Mexico Fed Cup team, she has a win/loss record of 3–1.

ITF Circuit finals

Singles: 7 (2 titles, 5 runner–ups)

Doubles: 17 (11 titles, 6 runner–ups)

External links
 
 
 

1999 births
Living people
Mexican female tennis players
Sportspeople from Oaxaca
21st-century Mexican women